Jawan Jamison (born November 23, 1991) is a former American football running back. He played college football for Rutgers University. He was selected in the seventh round of the 2013 NFL Draft by the Washington Redskins. He was considered one of the best running backs in his class.

Early years
Jamison attended The Bolles School in Jacksonville, Florida, where he played football and ran track. He was teammates with John Theus. He led Bolles to back-to-back Florida Class 2A state championships in 2008 and 2009. As a senior; Jamison rushed for over 1,700 yards and scored 17 touchdowns.

In track & field, Jamison was a standout sprinter. He posted a personal-best time of 10.87 seconds in the 100 meters. He was also a member of the 4 × 100 m (42.79 s) relay squad.

Considered a three-star recruit by Rivals.com, he was rated as the 21st all-purpose back in the nation. He accepted a scholarship from Rutgers over offers from Florida Atlantic and Northern Illinois.

College career
Jamison redshirted his first year and spent his time on the scout team. As a redshirt freshman in 2011, Jamison rushed for 897 yards on 231 carries with nine touchdowns. He was the MVP of the 2011 Pinstripe Bowl after rushing for 131 yards on 27 carries with two touchdowns. As a redshirt sophomore in 2012, he rushed for 1,054 yards on 242 carries four touchdowns. Jamison elected to not finish two years of eligibility and enter the 2013 NFL Draft. Most draft boards have Jamison projected as a third round pick.

Professional career

2013 NFL Combine

Washington Redskins
Jamison was drafted by the Washington Redskins in the seventh round (228th overall) of the 2013 NFL Draft. He officially signed a four-year contract with the team on May 16, 2013. The Redskins waived him on August 31, 2013, for final roster cuts before the start of 2013 season, he was signed to the team's practice squad the next day. On December 10, 2013, Jamison was added to the Redskins active roster, after a season-ending injury to running back Evan Royster. He was released on March 4, 2014.

Pittsburgh Steelers
Jamison was signed by the Pittsburgh Steelers on August 1, 2014. He was waived on August 11.

Bismarck Bucks
On January 7, 2017, Jamison signed with the Bismarck Bucks of Champions Indoor Football (CIF). Jamison was suspended on March 8, 2017, and was released March 9, 2017, appearing in just one game for the Bucks.

References

External links
Washington Redskins bio
Rutgers Scarlet Knights bio

1991 births
Living people
American football running backs
Rutgers Scarlet Knights football players
Washington Redskins players
Pittsburgh Steelers players
Bismarck Bucks players
Players of American football from Florida
People from Starke, Florida
Bolles School alumni